The following lists events that happened during 2014 in Venezuela.

Incumbents
President: Nicolás Maduro
Vice President: Jorge Arreaza

Governors
Amazonas: Liborio Guarulla 
Anzoátegui: Aristóbulo Istúriz
Apure: Ramón Carrizales
Aragua: Tareck El Aissami 
Barinas: Adán Chávez 
Bolívar: Francisco Rangel Gómez
Carabobo: Francisco Ameliach  
Cojedes: Erika Farías 
Delta Amacuro: Lizeta Hernández
Falcón: Stella Lugo 
Guárico: Ramón Rodríguez Chacín
Lara: Henri Falcón 
Mérida: Alexis Ramirez 
Miranda: Henrique Capriles Radonski 
Monagas: Yelitza Santaella
Nueva Esparta: Carlos Mata Figueroa 
Portuguesa: Wilmar Castro 
Sucre: Luis Acuña 
Táchira: José Vielma Mora 
Trujillo: Henry Rangel Silva
Vargas: Jorge García Carneiro
Yaracuy: Julio León Heredia
Zulia: Francisco Arias Cárdenas

Events

January
 January 6 - Venezuelan beauty queen Mónica Spear and her British ex-husband are murdered through a carjacking in Caracas.
 January 9 - Seven suspects are arrested in the deaths of Venezuelan actress and beauty star, Mónica Spear, and her ex-husband, whose 5-year-old daughter witnessed the roadside shooting and was also wounded.

February
 February 12 - Protesters march against the government in various cities across Venezuela with at least 2 people killed in the demonstrations.
 February 13 - Venezuelan President Nicolás Maduro arrests opposition activists in reaction to an "attempted coup" against his government.
 February 17 - Venezuela orders the expulsion of three United States consular officials amid rising tensions over anti-government protests after accusing the US of working with the opposition to undermine President Nicolás Maduro's government.
 February 21 - 22-year-old Venezuelan beauty queen Génesis Carmona is shot in the head and killed while participating in a student protest against Nicolás Maduro's socialist government.
 February 21 - Venezuelan President Nicolás Maduro threatens to expel CNN from the country, alleging that they are helping the opposition.
 February 22 - Tens of thousands of people gather in Caracas to protest against the government of Nicolás Maduro.

March
 March 1 - Clashes continue between anti-government protesters and security forces after 41 people are arrested.
 March 6 - The government of Venezuela cuts diplomatic ties with Panama calling it a "lackey of the United States".

April
 April 29 - Venezuelan officials announce that a former chief of the Bolivarian Intelligence Service, Eliecer Otaiza, was shot and killed on Saturday.

September
 September 24 - Venezuela's opposition parties named Jesus Torrealba, a 56-year-old journalist and teacher, to head their coalition ahead of 2015 parliamentary elections where they hope to weaken President Maduro's socialist government.

October 
 October 1 —  Pro-government legislator Robert Serra was murdered.

References

 
Years of the 21st century in Venezuela
Venezuela
Venezuela
2010s in Venezuela